Nasutixalus jerdonii is a species of frog in the family Rhacophoridae. It is found in the northeastern India, in the West Bengal, Nagaland, Manipur, and Meghalaya states. It range might extend into the adjacent Nepal. The specific name jerdonii honours Thomas C. Jerdon, an English herpetologist. Common names Jerdon's bubble-nest frog, Jerdon's tree frog, and Jerdon's bush frog have been coined for this species.

Taxonomy
This species was first described as Polypedates jerdonii in 1876 by Albert Günther. Its subsequent placement has included various genera. In 2016, Sathyabhama Das Biju and colleagues erected a new monotypic genus for this species, Frankixalus; the name of the genus honours  from the Free University of Brussels. However, just two days earlier, Jiang and colleagues had erected the genus Nasutixalus to accommodate this species and another, new species. This gives priority to Nasutixalus.

Description
Adult males measure  and adult females, based on a single specimen,  in snout–vent length. The snout is rather truncate and not protruding. The fingers have basal webbing while the toes have moderate webbing. The dorsal colouration is reddish-brown to brownish-grey. Various markings are present, including an X-shaped brownish-black marking in many specimens. Males have a vocal sac.

Habitat and conservation
Nasutixalus jerdonii occurs in montane evergreen forests and secondary forests. It is an arboreal species. Males call from tree holes. The eggs are laid on the inner walls of water-filled hollows, and the tadpoles develop in water. They are oophagous.

This species was for a long time only known from the type series collected in 1870. However, populations were discovered in surveys conducted in 2007–2010. The species is threatened by habitat disturbance caused by slash-and-burn agriculture.

References

jerdonii
Endemic fauna of India
Frogs of India
Taxa named by Albert Günther
Amphibians described in 1876
Taxonomy articles created by Polbot
Taxobox binomials not recognized by IUCN